Molterer is an Austrian surname. Notable people with the surname include:

Anderl Molterer (born 1931), Austrian skier
Wilhelm Molterer (born 1955), Austrian politician

German-language surnames